Andika County is in Khuzestan province, Iran. The capital of the county is Qaleh-ye Khvajeh. At the 2006 census, the county's population (as Andika District of Masjed Soleyman County) was 49,430 in 8,708 households. The following census in 2011 counted 50,797 people in the newly formed Andika County, in 10,440 households. At the 2016 census, the county's population was 47,629 in 11,578 households.

Administrative divisions

The population history and structural changes of Andika County's administrative divisions over three consecutive censuses are shown in the following table. The latest census shows two districts, six rural districts, and two cities.

References

 

Counties of Khuzestan Province